The Warsaw Metro is a rapid transit underground system serving the Polish capital Warsaw. It currently consists of two lines, the north-south Line M1 which links central Warsaw with its densely populated northern and southern districts, and the east-west Line M2, of which the westernmost segment is in construction. A third line (M3) is still being planned. The system is operated by Metro Warszawskie sp. z o.o., a company owned by the city, and managed by Zarząd Transportu Miejskiego w Warszawie (ZTM Warszawa).

The first section was opened in 1995 and gradually extended until it reached its full length in October 2008. There are additional plans to construct two more stations on this north-south line omitted during initial construction due to costs. The contract for the construction of the initial central section of the second line, running east-west was signed on 28 October 2009 and construction began on 16 August 2010. The initial segment of Line M2 was opened on 8 March 2015. The line is currently being expanded.

In 2009, the Warsaw Metro won two "Metro Award" prizes in the categories of "Special Merit Award for Commitment to the Environment" and "Best Maintenance Programme". These were followed by the Most Improved Metro award in 2011.  The system consistently receives very high ratings among its passengers; a survey conducted in September 2014 indicated that 98% of the respondents rated it as good or very good.

History 

Plans to build an underground rail system in Warsaw date as far back as 1918, when the idea was first proposed after Warsaw regained its status as Poland's capital city. An underground railway system was expected to solve the transport difficulties of the densely built city centre. Proper preliminary planning and boring work were initiated by the Warsaw Tramway Authority in 1925, with construction expected to start in the late 1920s. The Great Depression buried those plans as Poland and the world were gripped by economic hardship.

In 1934, with the election of a new mayor of Warsaw, Stefan Starzyński, work was to resume on the metro. The mayor dusted off the plans from the mid-1920s, and with some minor adjustments, construction of the metro was planned to start by the late 1930s, with a projected finishing date of the first of two projected lines scheduled for the mid-1940s. By then, the subway network was to consist of two lines. This line was to be connected with the newly constructed Warszawa Główna railway station and the railway tunnel crossing the city from west to east. There, the line was to go overground, cross the river through a newly built bridge and proceed to the easternmost railway station of Warszawa Wschodnia. Altogether, in 35 years, 7 lines were to be built. The works finally started in 1938, but World War II brought an end to the ambitious undertaking. The short trace tunnels made in 1938 serve as a wine cellar today.

The city suffered heavily during World War II. Although the majority of pre-war projects perished during the war, most of the engineers behind their creations survived and returned to their city to take part in its rebirth. However, the new Communist authorities of Poland envisioned a city completely different from what it had been before the war. As the "ideal" communist city, Warsaw was to be decentralized and the need to commute to the city centre was reduced. Thus, the Office for the Reconstruction of Warsaw (BOS) commissioned several engineers to prepare a project for a fast urban railway (SKM) crossing the city in a deep cutting. Although to a large extent it was to follow line 1 of the pre-war plans, only the central stations were to be located underground. However, by the end of the decade, the project was cancelled. The suggested north-south direction, with three parallel branches of the same line in the city centre, corresponded to the planned development of the city along the Vistula. The works, however, never started and this project was also abandoned.

In the 1950s, as the Cold War raged on, Soviet strategic plans required that a secure transport link across the river Vistula be built. One of the ways to achieve this was to create a deep metro system in Warsaw (up to  beneath the ground), which would be interlinked with the rail network and could serve as an underground conduit for transporting troops. The construction works started almost simultaneously at 17 different points on both sides of the river. By 1953 only  of tunnels had been built; after the death of Joseph Stalin and the start of a period of détente, all work was halted under the pretext of technical difficulties. In the following years, only one junction tunnel and one shield-driven tunnel were continued. These works were undertaken experimentally, to discover the best driving methods suitable for the ground conditions beneath Warsaw (pliocene clay formations layer spread beneath quaternary soils). Finally, in 1957, all work was halted.

Since 1955, planners returned to the old idea of a shallow metro network. However, the planning phase proceeded at a very slow pace and the economic situation prevented all successive governments from actually starting serious work. Finally, in 1983, the program was approved by the government and the first tunnels were built.

The Metro was opened on 7 April 1995 with a total of 11 stations.

The station names on the M1 line are announced by Ksawery Jasieński.

Timeline

Lines

Rolling stock

Initially, all of the trains were Russian-built. They first arrived in Warsaw in 1990 as a "gift" from the USSR, five years before the Metro's opening, from the Metrovagonmash plant in Mytishchi near Moscow (model 81-717.3/714.3 - 10 carriages). Subsequent trains arrived from Saint Petersburg's Yegorov Plant in 1994 (81-572/573 - 32 carriages) and an additional 18 81-572.1/573.1 carriages in 1997.

In 1998, 108 new carriages were ordered from the French company Alstom. These were all delivered by 2005 (24 were produced in Barcelona and the remainder in Chorzów). In 2006, additional carriages were ordered from Russia, with deliveries taking place up to 2007.

In February 2011, an order was signed with German manufacturer Siemens for 35 complete trains from their new Inspiro line. A large number of these were to be manufactured in Poland by Newag. The first 5 of these trains were put into service in 2013. However, in November 2013 a fire broke out in one of the carriages and for safety reasons all five trains were withdrawn from operation until the cause of the fire was determined. Once the investigation was completed the five new Inspiro trains were placed back into service in March 2014.

As of 2020, the majority of the operating rolling stock is Siemens-built (Siemens Inspiro type).

In January 2020, Skoda Transportation was awarded a new contract for 37 new, single-space trains. The first EMU arrived in Warsaw on April 25, 2022, in October the first unit entered regular passenger service on the M1 line.

Depots
A single depot is located south of the Kabaty station. There is a single-track connection between the depot and Warszawa-Okęcie station on the PKP rail network. This link is not electrified and is used only for an occasional rolling-stock transfer.

Plans

The first line was a compromise between earlier route proposals further east and west (one of which belonged to the planned Line 4) and as such does not go to some important areas of the city. Until the opening of the second line in March 2015, the Metro system was confined to the western bank of the Vistula river, thus doing nothing to ease traffic problems on Warsaw's bridges, a major bottleneck between the city center and the eastern Praga district. Plans for the third line to Warsaw Chopin Airport have been abandoned for the foreseeable future, with the airport served by a new railway station instead.

Transport planners have suggested that the WKD, a light rail line that runs to the western suburbs, could be integrated with the city's tram system, or be more closely tied to the Metro and a future suburban rail network, or both. The first such plans were prepared in the late 1930s and the railway tunnel running below the city centre was to be shared by both the railways and the metro. In the mid-1990s the WKD, PKP and Warsaw Metro systems were temporarily integrated and Warsaw city travel cards were valid also in the suburban railways. This idea was, however, dropped in 1999 due to financial problems.

Recently completed extensions
On 30 April construction on Szwedzka station started, and on 2 May the other two stations started construction. Construction of this phase took 3 years and it opened on 15 September 2019. Initially, this extension was to be built at the same time as the west extension which was due to be completed in 2020. However, due to delays, it was decided that each extension will be built at its own pace. 

On 28 September 2022, the extension of M2 consisting of three new stations: Zacisze, Kondratowicza and Bródno was opened to the public.

Future extensions
 Plac Konstytucji and Muranów, two stations omitted from the original plan to reduce cost were to be built by 2009, but construction has not yet started, and will not start soon.
 Line M2: the first, central section now consists of eighteen stations: Bemowo, Ulrychów, Księcia Janusza, Młynów, Płocka, Rondo Daszyńskiego, Rondo ONZ, Świętokrzyska, Nowy Świat, Centrum Nauki Kopernik, Stadion Narodowy, Dworzec Wileński, Szwedzka, Targówek Mieszkaniowy, Trocka, Zacisze, Kondratowicza and Bródno. It passes under the Vistula river between the Centrum Nauki Kopernik and Stadion Narodowy stations. Most of the funding for building this section was secured from the European Union and construction started in August 2010. The original plan to finish this section in time for Euro 2012 was too optimistic, with completion occurring in March 2015. This line was built using a different boring technology that allowed for much faster construction compared to the first. The rest of Line M2 and its branches, totaling 28 stations, will be built in the future. A tender was opened for 35 trains (most to be used on Line M2, some on Line M1); Škoda Transportation and Metrovagonmash submitted the lowest price but Siemens/Newag scored more points and were chosen to provide the trains.

 The final Warsaw Metro plan calls for four lines incorporating  of the track.

Network map

See also 
 Transport in Poland
 Zarząd Transportu Miejskiego w Warszawie
 List of metro systems

References 
Inline citations

Bibliography

External links 

 
 
 Warsaw at UrbanRail.net
 Warsaw Metro Map
 Warsaw Metro fan site and discussion forum 
 pictures of Warsaw Metro 
 Stations as Canvas: Painting the Warsaw Metro

Videos
 Television TVPW - The Information Movie about Warsaw Metro system (production: TVPW) 
 Television TVPW - Relation of opening the "Słodowiec" station (production: TVPW) 
 Television TVPW - The movie about building the metro in Warsaw from the beginning to the end (production: TVPW) 
 Television TVPW - The interview with Robert Jaryczewski - the best metro driver of the world in 2008 (production: TVPW) 
 Television TVPW - The movie about signaling in metro in Warsaw (production: TVPW) 

 
Railway companies of Poland
Railway lines opened in 1995
1995 establishments in Poland
Transport in Warsaw
Railway infrastructure companies
Underground rapid transit in Poland